Smiths Lake is a small village in the Mid North Coast region of Pacific Palms, located within the Mid-Coast Council local government area of New South Wales, Australia. Smiths Lake gives its name to the village, situated nearby. At the 2016 census, Smiths Lake had a population of  people.

The lake

Tourism 
Smiths Lake is a popular tourist destination, mostly due to its position next to several waterways. Popular tourist activities include boating and fishing on the local lakes (Smiths Lake, Myall Lakes and Wallis Lake) or swimming and sunbathing at the local beaches (Cellito beach, Blueys beach, Boomerang beach, Elizabeth beach, and Seal Rocks beach – also the unofficially naturist Shelley Beach).

Commercial fishing 
Smiths Lake supported a small but viable commercial fishing industry up until April 2007, when the lake was incorporated into the Port Stephens-Great Lakes Marine Park. Because of this, the western third of Smiths Lake is classed as a Sanctuary Zone and the northeastern area, known as Symes Bay, is classed as Habitat Protection Zone, which means commercial fishing in more than two thirds of the lake is no longer permitted.

Notes and references

Towns in the Hunter Region
Suburbs of Mid-Coast Council